Interstate 90 (I-90) is a part of the Interstate Highway System that runs from Seattle, Washington, to Boston, Massachusetts. In the US state of New York, I-90 extends  from the Pennsylvania state line at Ripley to the Massachusetts state line at Canaan, and is the second-longest highway in the state after New York State Route 17 (NY 17). Although most of the route is part of the tolled New York State Thruway, two non-tolled sections exist along I-90 (the first, situated outside of Buffalo, is included in the Thruway system; the second, situated in the Capital District, is not part of the Thruway system and links Albany and its eastern suburbs). Within New York, I-90 has a complete set of auxiliary Interstates, which means that there are Interstates numbered I-190 through I-990 in the state, with no gaps in between. For most of its length in New York, I-90 runs parallel to the former Erie Canal route, NY 5, US Route 20 (US 20) and the CSX Transportation railroad mainline that traverses the state.

I-90 was assigned in 1957 as part of the establishment of the Interstate Highway System. In New York, it was overlaid on the preexisting New York State Thruway from Pennsylvania to Albany, from where it would have continued to Massachusetts on a new freeway that bypassed the Berkshire Connector to the north. Ultimately, the freeway was built from the Thruway mainline in Albany to the Berkshire Connector in Schodack, and I-90 was assigned to the segment of the connector east of the proposed freeway. The Albany–Schodack freeway was completed in stages during the 1960s and 1970s and fully open by 1977.

Route description

New York State Thruway 

West of Albany, I-90 in New York is designated along the mainline of the New York State Thruway. The Thruway begins at the Pennsylvania state line in Chautauqua County, following the shore of Lake Erie northeast and passes through the town of Cheektowaga, a large suburb of Buffalo directly east of the city. Two auxiliary routes, I-190 (leading to Niagara Falls and connecting into Canada as Ontario Highway 405) and I-290 (a northerly bypass of Buffalo) connect with I-90 here. Both auxiliary routes provide access between I-90 and Canada's largest city, Toronto. East of Erie County, the Thruway turns east and passes through the suburbs of several major cities in Upstate New York, generally following the path of the Erie Canal. It passes south of Rochester and north of Syracuse, which are served by three auxiliary Interstate Highways: I-490 and I-390 connect to Rochester, while I-690 leads to Syracuse. The speed limit, enforced by the New York State Police, is  along most of this stretch.

East of Syracuse, the Thruway follows the Erie Canal and, later, the Mohawk River into the Mohawk Valley toward Utica, where I-90 skirts the northern edge of downtown and meets I-790, a short route leading into the city's center. Farther east, the freeway indirectly serves the canal and riverside cities of Little Falls (via NY 169) and Amsterdam (NY 30) on its way to Schenectady, where I-890 splits from the Thruway and serves as the connection to the city center. It rejoins I-90 in Albany County, where I-90 leaves the mainline of the Thruway at exit 24 in Albany, which is signed for I-87 north and I-90 east. Here, the route designation of the Thruway changes from I-90 east to I-87 south. Traffic intending to continue on I-90 or reach I-87 north must exit the Thruway here. Exit numbers and mile markers for I-90 reset after exiting.

Albany and Rensselaer counties 

The Albany–Schodack section of I-90—the only portion of I-90 in New York that is not part of the Thruway system—begins concurrent with I-87 and heads southeast from Thruway exit 24. Now a toll-free highway, I-90 and I-87 continue to exits 1N and 1S, which are for the Adirondack Northway (I-87) and Fuller Road Alternate (unsigned NY 910F), respectively. Located off exit 1S and Fuller Road Alternate, a spur of the Northway leading to Western Avenue (US 20), is Crossgates Mall in Guilderland. I-90 proceeds eastward, meeting Washington Avenue at an interchange connecting to the University of Albany, SUNY, a state university, eastbound and Fuller Road (County Route 156 [CR 156]) westbound.

I-90 subsequently crosses over NY 5 and passes north of Westgate Plaza as it connects to Everett Road (CR 155). The freeway continues along the northern edge of Albany to exit 5A, a large trumpet interchange originally built to serve I-687. After that project was canceled, it was repurposed as an exit for Corporate Woods Boulevard. Albany Memorial Hospital is located just north of the exit on US 9.

Not far to the east of US 9 is a second stack interchange, connecting I-90 to I-787 in the industrial northeasternmost section of the city of Albany. At this point, I-90 turns to the southeast and follows the Patroon Island Bridge over the Hudson River and into Rensselaer County. Across the river, I-90 becomes the Rensselaer County Veterans Memorial Highway and passes through much less developed areas. In its first  in the county, the freeway meets Washington Avenue at the northern edge of the city of Rensselaer and the west end of NY 43 in the town of North Greenbush, southwest of US 4 and Defreestville. South of NY 43, I-90 and US 4 follow parallel routings into East Greenbush, where I-90 directly connects to US 4 at exit 9.

I-90 heads southeastward across an undeveloped, forested section of the county, crossing over NY 151 and entering the town of Schodack, where it meets Miller Road, a connector between I-90 and the concurrent routes of US 9 and US 20. The freeway and the overlapping US Routes follow similar routings to Schodack Center, at which point I-90 finally connects to US 9 and US 20 at exits 11E and 11W. I-90 heads due south from this point, passing over NY 150 and paralleling US 9, which splits from US 20 at Schodack Center. The routes cross paths again at exit 12 just north of where I-90 rejoins the Thruway system at exit B1 of the Berkshire Connector.

Berkshire Connector 

I-90 heads southeast on the connector, meeting the north end of the Taconic State Parkway in the Columbia County town of Chatham at exit B2 and NY 22 at exit B3 in the town of Canaan  from the Massachusetts state line. The Berkshire Connector ends at the state line; however, I-90 continues southeast into Massachusetts as the Massachusetts Turnpike.

History 

The east–west corridor I-90 follows across New York has always been major, followed by the Genesee Trail (1790s), Erie Canal (1825), New York Central Railroad (1853), and later the Yellowstone Trail (1912), which became US 20 and NY 5. It was planned as part of a nationwide toll road system as early as 1938. Exactly which cities would be served changed over the years, but it was the state of New York that made the decision in 1942, when they passed a law for the construction of a New York City–Albany–Buffalo–Pennsylvania "thruway". This highway, passing Utica, Syracuse, and Rochester on its path between Albany and Buffalo, would provide construction jobs in the post-World War II period. The Berkshire Thruway, a branch east from near Albany to Massachusetts, was authorized in 1944, completing the east–west route across the state. However, construction, which began in 1946, proceeded very slowly, with only one  portion open by 1950, when a law created the New York State Thruway Authority (NYSTA) to operate the route as a toll road. Construction then progressed much more rapidly, especially after 1954, when the authority was allowed to issue bonds not backed by the state (thus having higher interest rates). The roadway was completed between Buffalo and Albany in 1954, to New York City in 1956, to Pennsylvania in 1957, and to Massachusetts in 1959.

In the meantime, the National Interstate and Defense Highways Act was enacted in 1956, promising a toll-free network of Interstate Highways throughout the nation. The Bureau of Public Roads (BPR) commissioner soon announced that the toll road met all federal Interstate Highway standards, and, on August 14, 1957, most of the mainline of the Thruway was incorporated into the system as part of I-87 and I-90. Most of the connecting Massachusetts Turnpike was also included, but a more northerly alignment, avoiding the Berkshire Thruway, was proposed by the states of New York and Massachusetts for I-90 through Albany past Pittsfield to East Lee, Massachusetts. This alignment would be about 30 percent shorter than the all-toll alignment and would provide relief to the four-lane Castleton Bridge on the Berkshire Thruway, which had been built narrower than the rest of the system because of the planned parallel alternate. The BPR objected to the duplication, which would cost over $90 million (equivalent to $ in ), and refused to approve this alignment. The eventual route ran southeast from Albany to the Berkshire Thruway at the Nassau interchange, providing Albany with an alternate route and additional bridge but not offering any savings in distance and creating a "toll trap" for drivers accessing the Taconic State Parkway from Albany.

Construction on the route of I-90 through Albany began , with both ends at existing Thruway interchanges: exit 24, which crossed the Adirondack Northway (I-87) at a cloverleaf interchange and connected to Washington Avenue in western Albany, and exit B1, which connected to US 9 near Nassau. Work on the freeway began at the Northway and progressed southeasterly to the Berkshire Connector in Rensselaer County. The portion between the Northway and Everett Road was opened to traffic in the mid-1960s while the piece extending from Everett Road to US 4 east of Rensselaer was completed in the early 1970s. The last section of the highway was completed to US 9 and US 20 in Schodack Center  and finished by 1977. The Northway cloverleaf was rebuilt in the late 1980s.

In 1999, the New York State Department of Transportation (NYSDOT), the Federal Highway Administration (FHWA), and NYSTA discussed redesignating the Berkshire Connector as I-90 and redesignating the non-toll part of I-90 from Thruway exit 24 to exit B1 on the connector as I-88. The section of the Thruway between exits 25 and 24 would then be codesignated as both I-90 and I-88. This was never implemented.

Exit list 
The mileposts below for the non-Thruway section follow actual signage, where mile 0.00 is located at exit 24 of the Thruway.

All exits in New York use sequential numbering.

See also 

 New York State Thruway

References

External links 

 New York
90
Transportation in Chautauqua County, New York
Transportation in Genesee County, New York
Transportation in Monroe County, New York
Transportation in Ontario County, New York
Transportation in Seneca County, New York
Transportation in Cayuga County, New York
Transportation in Onondaga County, New York
Transportation in Madison County, New York
Transportation in Oneida County, New York
Transportation in Herkimer County, New York
Transportation in Montgomery County, New York
Transportation in Schenectady County, New York
Transportation in Rensselaer County, New York
Transportation in Columbia County, New York
Transportation in Albany County, New York
New York State Thruway Authority
Transportation in Erie County, New York
Central New York